Sigmurethra is a taxonomic category of air-breathing land snails and slugs, terrestrial pulmonate gastropod molluscs. This is an informal group which includes most land snails and slugs.

The two strong synapomorphies of Sigmurethra are a long pedal gland placed beneath a membrane and retractile tentacles.

Several families in this group contain species of snails and slugs that create love darts.

Sigmurethra are known from the Cretaceous to the Recent periods.

Taxonomy

2005 Taxonomy
In the taxonomy of the Gastropoda by Bouchet & Rocroi, 2005, Sigmurethra is an "Informal Group", a subsection of the Stylommatophora.
It consists of the following families:
Superfamily Clausilioidea
Family Clausiliidae
 † Family Anadromidae
 † Family Filholiidae
 † Family Palaeostoidae
Superfamily Orthalicoidea
Family Orthalicidae
Family Cerionidae
Family Coelociontidae
 † Family Grangerellidae
Family Megaspiridae
Family Placostylidae
Family Urocoptidae
Superfamily Achatinoidea
Family Achatinidae
Family Ferussaciidae
Family Micractaeonidae
Family Subulinidae
Superfamily Aillyoidea
Family Aillyidae
Superfamily Testacelloidea
Family Testacellidae
Family Oleacinidae
Family Spiraxidae
Superfamily Papillodermatoidea
Family Papillodermatidae
Superfamily Streptaxoidea
Family Streptaxidae
Superfamily  Rhytidoidea
Family Rhytididae
Family Chlamydephoridae
Family Haplotrematidae
Family Scolodontidae
Superfamily Acavoidea
Family Acavidae
Family Caryodidae
Family Dorcasiidae
Family Macrocyclidae
Family Megomphicidae
Family Strophocheilidae
Superfamily Plectopyloidea
Family Plectopylidae
Family Corillidae
Family Sculptariidae
Superfamily Punctoidea
Family Punctidae
 † Family Anastomopsidae
Family Charopidae
Family Cystopeltidae
Family Discidae
Family Endodontidae
Family Helicodiscidae
Family Oreohelicidae
Family Thyrophorellidae
Superfamily Sagdoidea
Family Sagdidae

limacoid clade
Superfamily Staffordioidea
Family Staffordiidae
Superfamily Dyakioidea
Family Dyakiidae
Superfamily Gastrodontoidea
Family Gastrodontidae
Family Chronidae
Family Euconulidae
Family Oxychilidae
Family Pristilomatidae
Family Trochomorphidae
Fossil taxa probably belonging to the Gastrodontoidea
Subfamily † Archaeozonitinae
Subfamily † Grandipatulinae
Subfamily † Palaeoxestininae
Superfamily Parmacelloidea
Family Parmacellidae
Family Milacidae
Family Trigonochlamydidae
Superfamily Zonitoidea
Family Zonitidae
Superfamily Helicarionoidea
Family Helicarionidae
Family Ariophantidae
Family Urocyclidae
Superfamily Limacoidea
Family Limacidae
Family Agriolimacidae
Family Boettgerillidae
Family Vitrinidae

Informal group Sigmurethra continued
Two superfamilies belongs to clade Sigmurethra, but they are not in the limacoid clade.
Superfamily Arionoidea
Family Arionidae
Family Anadenidae
Family Ariolimacidae
Family Binneyidae
Family Oopeltidae
Family Philomycidae
Superfamily Helicoidea
Family Helicidae
Family Bradybaenidae
Family Camaenidae
Family Cepolidae
Family Cochlicellidae
Family Elonidae
Family Epiphragmophoridae
Family Halolimnohelicidae
Family Helicodontidae
Family Helminthoglyptidae
Family Humboldtianidae
Family Hygromiidae
Family Monadeniidae
Family Pleurodontidae
Family Polygyridae
Family Sphincterochilidae
Family Thysanophoridae
Family Trissexodontidae
Family Xanthonychidae

(Families that are exclusively fossil are indicated with a dagger †)

New families after 2005
Superfamily Streptaxoidea
 Diapheridae - In 2010, Sutcharit et al. (2010) established a new family Diapheridae within the Streptaxoidea.

2017 Taxonomy
After excluding groups not related, the informal group Sigmurethra becomes suborder Helicina, with the following nine infraorders and a collection of families with no superfamily：
Suborder Helicina ("Non-Achatinoid Clade")
Infraorder Arionoidei
Infraorder Clausilioidei
Infraorder Helicoidei: formed from Helicoidea  and Sagdoidea 
Infraorder Limacoidei: formed from original limacoid clade
Infraorder Oleacinoidei
Oleacinoidea: formed from original Testacelloidea but with the family Testacellidae excluded;
Haplotrematoidea: formed from original Rhytidoidea and Haplotrematidae
Infraorder Orthalicoidei
Infraorder Pupilloidei (Orthurethra)
Infraorder Rhytidoidei: formed by Rhytidoidea merging with contents from Acavoidea.
Infraorder Succineoidei (Elasmognatha)

References

Stylommatophora
Extant Cretaceous first appearances
Gastropod taxonomy